Fatma Işık (born 20 April 1991) is a Turkish-German women's football defender currently playing in the German Regional League South for FV Löchgau. She was a member of the Turkish national team.

Playing career

Club
She played for FV Löchgau (2011–12, 2015–2019) in the German Regional League South.

International

She was admitted to the Turkey women's national football team, and debuted internationally in the 2019 FIFA Women's World Cup qualification – UEFA preliminary round – Group 4 match against Montenegro.

References

External links

Living people
1991 births
German people of Turkish descent
German women's footballers
Turkish women's footballers
Women's association football defenders
Turkey women's international footballers